Ianusanta is a Neotropical butterfly genus in the family Lycaenidae. The genus is monotypic containing the single species Ianusanta ianusi from Peru.

References

Lycaenidae of South America
Eumaeini
Monotypic butterfly genera